Pliosaurus (meaning 'more lizard') is an extinct genus of thalassophonean pliosaurid known from the Kimmeridgian and Tithonian stages (Late Jurassic) of Europe and South America. Their diet would have included fish, cephalopods, and marine reptiles. This genus has contained many species in the past but recent reviews found only six (P. brachydeirus, P. carpenteri, P. funkei, P. kevani, P. rossicus and P. westburyensis) to be valid, while the validity of two additional species awaits a petition to the International Code of Zoological Nomenclature. Currently, P. brachyspondylus and P. macromerus are considered dubious, while P. portentificus is considered undiagnostic. Species of this genus are differentiated from other pliosaurids based on seven autapomorphies, including teeth that are triangular in cross section.

Discovery and species

Pliosaurus brachydeirus

Pliosaurus brachydeirus is the type species of the genus. It was first described and named by the English paleontologist Richard Owen in 1841, as a species of the wastebasket taxon Plesiosaurus in its own subgenus Pleiosaurus, creating Plesiosaurus (Pleiosaurus) brachydeirus. Later that year or in 1842, Owen published another study in which the species was relocated to its own genus, which he misspelled as Pliosaurus. As have been noted by several authors, Plesiosaurus (Pleiosaurus) is the original spelling of Pliosaurus, and therefore according to Article 32 of the ICZN, Pleiosaurus is the correct spelling of the generic name as well. However, because this spelling had been abandoned since Phillips (1871), Pliosaurus should be preserved according to Article 33.3.1 of the ICZN. The etymology of the specific name was not specified, but it probably refers to the shorter teeth of P. brachydeirus compared to teeth of other species then referred to Plesiosaurus. The specific name has occasionally erroneously been spelled as brachydirus, for example by Richard Lydekker (1889a, 1889b).

P. brachydeirus is known from the holotype which includes seven specimens found in association and housed at Oxford University Museum of Natural History, OUMNH J.9245, OUMNH J.9247 through OUMNH J.9301 and OUMNH J.10453. The specimen consists of a partial skull and lower jaw, several axial elements and limb material. Other specimens that are referable to this species include OUMNH J.9285, and OUMNH J.9192 through OUMNH J.9301, all described by Owen (1841–1842) and were found associated with the holotype. The specimens were collected by Prof. William Buckland at Market Rasen, Lincolnshire, from the Rasenia cymodoce ammonite zone of the lower Kimmeridge Clay Formation, dating to the early Kimmeridgian stage.

Knutsen (2012) revised the validity of this species and was able to diagnose it on a basis of combination of traits. P. brachydeirus had approximately 70 teeth in the lower jaw (72 according to Benson et al. (2013)), 8-9 or more pairs of symphyseal teeth in dorsal view (12 pairs according to Benson et al. (2013)) and 5 or more premaxillary teeth. It shows "type III" retroarticular process and autapomorphic (unique) traits of the cervical vertebrae, which had a smooth ventral surface and a ventral keel, unlike rounded to flat ventral surface seen in other species. Benson et al. (2013) also noted that it lacks anisodont premaxillary dentition. The ontogenetic stage of the holotype of P. brachydeirus is not known, but the rounded edge on the distal end of the femur and lack of separation between the femoral capitulum and trochanter suggests that it is from a relatively young individual. According to Benson et al. (2013), the flat morphology of the proximal surface of the radius or tibia also suggests that it is a juvenile.

Pliosaurus carpenteri 
The specimen was collected at the Westbury Clay pit, Wiltshire, from subdivision E4 of the Aulacostephanus eudoxus ammonite zone, seven metres below the Crussoliceras Limestone of the Kimmeridge Clay Formation, dating to the late Kimmeridgian. Nicknamed "Westbury pliosaur II", it was first described by Sassoon et al. (2012) who, together with Knutsen (2012), assigned it tentatively to Pliosaurus sp.. It was reassigned to its own species by Roger B. J. Benson, Mark Evans, Adam S. Smith, Judyth Sassoon, Scott Moore-Faye, Hilary F. Ketchum and Richard Forrest in 2013. The specific name honors Simon Carpenter, the discoverer and collector of BRSMG Cd6172.

Sassoon et al. (2012) originally ascribed the differences between BRSMG Cc332 (the holotype of P. westburyensis) and BRSMG Cd6172 to intraspecific variation, with these specimens possibly being sexual dimorphs, due to fact that both were collected from close stratigraphic levels of the same quarry. However, Benson et al. (2013) showed that the differences between them are relatively great even in the context of specimens from other localities. They diagnosed P. carpenteri based on a single autapomorphy – unlike all other thalassophoneans other than the proposed neotype of P. brachyspondylus, the dorsal surface of the surangular lacks any fossa, and in contrast to all other specimens of Pliosaurus faces dorsally, not inclined to face dorsolaterally. P. carpenteri also possesses a unique combination of characters, including: low dentary alveolar count including only 18 postsymphysial alveoli, and a total count of 27; intermediate low count of syphysial alveoli including only 9; teeth fully trihedral, possessing a flat, anteroposteriorly broad labial surface lacking enamel ridges; mediolateral expansion of caniniform regions of the premaxilla and maxilla relatively pronounced, although this might be due to crushing; six closely spaced premaxillary alveoli; anisodont premaxillary dentition; diastema present between maxillary and premaxillary alveolar rows; premaxilla–parietal suture located level with the anterior region of the orbit; cervical centra lacking ventral ridge; and epipodials with highly convex proximal surfaces.

Pliosaurus funkei 

 
P. funkei is known from two partial skeletons, the holotype PMO 214.135 and the referred PMO 214.136, from the Svalbard archipelago of Norway. Housed at the University of Oslo Natural History Museum, the skeletons were found south of Sassenfjorden, from the southeast side of Mount Knerten, in the Arctic Spitsbergen island. This stratigraphic horizon belongs to the Dorsoplanites ilovaiskyi to Dorsoplanites maximus ammonite zones (probably to the latter), of the middle Volgian stage which correlates with the middle Tithonian stage. The skeletons were discovered during eight seasons of fieldwork (2004–2012 field seasons) in the Slottsmøya Member, that have yielded other skeletal remains of marine reptiles, including the plesiosauroids Colymbosaurus svalbardensis, Djupedalia and Spitrasaurus, and the ichthyosaurs Cryopterygius and Palvennia. P. funkei was first described and named by Espen M. Knutsen, Patrick S. Druckenmiller and Jørn H. Hurum in 2012. The specific name honors Bjørn Funke, the discoverer of the holotype, and his wife May-Liss Knudsen Funke for volunteering in the paleontological collections at the Museum.

The holotype of P. funkei is represented by the anterior portions of the upper and lower jaws (including premaxillary and dentary teeth), one nearly complete cervical centrum and two partial cervical centra, three pectoral centra with neural arches, fifteen dorsal centra and eight neural arches, a complete right coracoid, numerous rib fragments and gastralia, and a complete right forelimb. The referred specimen is represented by five partial cervical centra, one partial dorsal centrum, and a partial skull including the occipital condyle, a complete left quadrate, a partial left squamosal and incomplete left surangular and articular. Several fragmentary and unidentified bones also pertain to PMO 214.136. Due to the Arctic climate of Svalbard, the specimens were subjected to repeated freeze-thaw cycles before collection, extensively fracturing and degrading the material. PMO 214.136 was discovered in 2007, following the collection of approximately 20,000 fragments that compose PMO 214.135 which were found moist in situ and degraded upon drying during the preparation process (individual fragments are catalogued at the University of Oslo Natural History Museum by specimen number followed by a slash and a number). Due to its large size and relative completeness, the species, nicknamed "Predator X" before its formal description, gained extensive media coverage, which claimed that it was "most fearsome animal ever to swim in the oceans". Morphological and histological characters, such as the presence of a tuberosity on the humerus and a well developed anterior process on the coracoid, and abnormal hardening and increase in density of bone, indicate that both specimens were adult individuals. Even though none of the neural arches are fused to their centra in the vertebral column of both individuals (a possible juvenile trait), this feature is present in all large pliosaurids, and thus possibly paedomorphic within Pliosauridae.

Knutsen et al. (2012) diagnosed the species based on a unique combination of characters of the holotype. P. funkei has a possibly unique "type I" retroarticular process, unlike P. brachydeirus, P. brachyspondylus and P. macromerus. Unlike P. brachydeirus, its cervical centra possess a rugose ventral surface, but lack ventral keel. Finally, it possesses comparatively longer forelimbs than other known pliosaurids, with a long humerus, more than 7 times the average width of cervical vertebral centra, in comparison to P. brachyspondylus and P. rossicus, which have humeri less than 4.5 times the cervical width. Its complete teeth count is not known, however, it has at least six pairs of teeth in the mandibular symphysis, and at least five premaxillary tooth pairs. The two known individuals of P. funkei preserve mostly different regions of the skeleton and overlap only by cervical vertebrae. Nevertheless, these cervical vertebrae are morphologically indistinguishable, and both individuals were found in proximity to one another, at exactly the same stratigraphic horizon of the Slottsmøya member, strongly supporting the referral of PMO 214.136 to P. funkei. Knutsen et al. (2012) suggested that P. funkei is more similar to P. rossicus and the proposed neotype of P. macromerus than to P. brachydeirus and the proposed neotype of P. brachyspondylus in its cranial morphology.

Analysis of bones from the four flippers suggest that the animal cruised using only the fore-flippers, using the back flippers for extra speed when pursuing and capturing prey.

Predator X's brain was of a similar type and size, proportionally, to that of today's great white shark, the team says.

A television programme entitled Predator X first aired on History in 2009. It was also featured in the fourth episode of the BBC documentary series Planet Dinosaur in 2011, where it is shown hunting Kimmerosaurus, a smaller plesiosaur. The scene is based on damages to the one known skull of Kimmerosaurus, showing damage consistent with an attack of a very large animal with Liopleurodon-like dentition.

Pliosaurus kevani 
 
The specimen was collected at Wyke Siltstone bed of Osmington Bay, from the Rasenia cymodoce ammonite zone, Kimmeridge Clay Formation of the Ancholme Group, dating to the early Kimmeridgian. Most pieces were collected from loose or fallen blocks without any permits required, while other parts were collected in situ and purchased from land owners. They were first identified as a pliosaurid skull by Richard Edmonds, Earth Sciences Manager for Dorset and East Devon Coast World Heritage Site Team. Due to its large size and completeness, the specimen gained extensive media coverage, and its acquisition was announced publicly in October 2009. Additional elements were later donated by Patrick Clarke and purchased from Shirley Swaine. DORCM G.13,675 went on display in Dorchester County Museum in July 2011, after being in preparation between March 2010 and March 2011. Preparation of the lower jaws took 200 hours and a further 365 hours were needed to complete preparation of the skull. P. kevani was first described and named by Roger B. J. Benson, Mark Evans, Adam S. Smith, Judyth Sassoon, Scott Moore-Faye, Hilary F. Ketchum and Richard Forrest in 2013. The specific name honors Kevan Sheehan, the owner of a small café overlooking the sea at Osmington Mills, who collected most of the holotype during daily walks along the foreshore.

 
Benson et al. (2013) diagnosed the species based on four autapomorphies of the holotype. The subrectangular sheet of the maxilla extends anteriorly on alveolar surface of the premaxilla to contact the distalmost premaxillary alveolus, while in other species of Pliosaurus an interdigitating premaxilla-maxilla suture is located midway between the mesialmost maxillary and distalmost premaxillary alveoli. Its pineal foramen is surrounded by a raised rim, while other thalassophoneans have a shallow fossa containing anteroposteriorly oriented grooves or ridges, that extends anteriorly from the pineal foramen. The mesial postsymphysial dentary alveoli are everted to face dorsolaterally, and not dorsally as seen in other species. Finally, the lateral surface of the mandible dorsoventrally concave posteriorly, while other thalassophoneans show flat or weakly convex lateral surface of the postedentary bones. P. kevani also possesses a unique combination of characters, including: high dentary alveolar count including 22 postsymphysial alveoli and an estimated total count of 36–37; high count of symphysial dentary alveoli including at least 7, estimated as 14–15; subtrihedral teeth, possessing a suboval cross-section with slightly flattened labial surface bearing only thinly distributed enamel ridges; pronounced mediolateral expansion of caniniform regions of the premaxilla and maxilla; six closely spaced premaxillary alveoli; anisodont premaxillary dentition; and premaxilla–parietal suture located level with the anterior region of the orbit.

CAMSM J.35990, a complete postcranial skeleton originally referred to Stretosaurus macromerus, and later to Pliosaurus sp., might also pertain to P. kevani. Although non-diagnostic at the species level, Benson et al. (2013) differentiated it from most specimens of Pliosaurus based on its subtrihedral teeth, which are otherwise present only in Pliosaurus kevani, and possibly also in Gallardosaurus iturraldei from the Oxfordian of Cuba. Even though it shares with the holotype of P. kevani a very large body size and stratigraphically closer to it, otherwise the specimens cannot be directly compared. Therefore, it was tentatively referred to as Pliosaurus cf. kevani. A subtrihedral tooth from the Kimmeridge Clay of Ely, LEICT G418.1965.108, is also referred to Pliosaurus cf. kevani based on similar arguments.

Pliosaurus rossicus 

P. rossicus was first described and named by Nestor Ivanovich Novozhilov in 1948. The specific name is derived from the name of Russia, where the holotype was found. The holotype of P. rossicus, PIN 304/1 housed at Paleontological Institute, Russian Academy of Sciences, consists of cranial and some postcranial remains of a relatively small pliosaur. It was collected at the right bank of the Volga River, of Chuvashia, European part of Russia, from the Buinsk Mine oil shales, Dorsoplanites panderi ammonite zone, dating to the middle Volgian stage (also known as middle Tithonian). Novozhilov (1964) later also described some pectoral remains associated with the holotype. The holotype preserved trihedral teeth like other members of Pliosaurus, and bears 6 tooth pairs in the mandibular symphysis, similar to OUMNH J.10454. Halstead (1971) reassigned this species to Liopleurodon based on this symphyseal tooth count, but Knutsen (2012) and Benson et al. (2013) referred it back to Pliosaurus, as it exhibits the diagnostic traits of the genus such as trihedral teeth. PIN 304/1 has also been interpreted as a juvenile by both Halstead (1971) and Storrs et al. (2000) based on its relatively small size and poorly developed dorsal blade and anteroventral ramus of the scapula.

Halstead (1971) referred a second, larger specimen PIN 2440/1 consisting of a partial rostrum and hind limb, to P. rossicus. PIN 2440/1 was originally described as Pliosaurus cf. grandis by Rozhdestvenskii (1947), but later referred to P. rossicus based on the presence of a similar number of mandibular symphyseal teeth with the holotye and their relative stratigraphic co-occurrence. Another specimen of large pliosaur was tentatively assigned to P. rossicus by Malakhov (1999). The specimen was collected from the lower Volgian (early Tithonian) of Kazakhstan, and represents postcranial remains No. 13-1958, at Institute of Zoology MS-AS RK.
 
Knutsen (2012) suggested possible synonymy between P. macromerus and P. rossicus based on the presence of only six symphysial and five premaxillary alveoli in both. Nevertheless, he provisionally retained P. rossicus as a separate species, as the stratigraphic ranges of the two taxa do not overlap, and the specimens were not adequate described. However, a reexamination of NHMUK PV OR 39362 (proposed neotype of P. macromerus) by Benson et al. (2013), revealed that it had at least seven symphyseal tooth, but more likely nine. Therefore, they considered P. rossicus to be a valid species of Pliosaurus based on the presence of an autapomorphic short symphysis containing only six alveoli. Based on the presence of this trait, they tentatively referred OUMNH J.10454 (and thus possibly OUMNH J.50376 and OUMNH J.50377) to P. ? rossicus. These specimens were all collected at Chawley brick pit, of the upper part of the Lower Kimmeridge Clay, dating to the late Kimmeridgian, and were originally assigned to P. macromerus. (2013) argued that this cannot be currently determined. Apart from the autapomorphy noted above and trihedral teeth, P. rossicus possesses the following combination of characters (based on its holotype): 5 premaxillary tooth pairs; cervical vertebrae with ornamented ventral surface, but lacking ventral keel; proportionally shorter humeri than P. funkei, less than 4.5 times the average width of cervical centra, versus more than 7 times.

Pliosaurus westburyensis 

P. westburyensis is known solely from the holotype BRSMG Cc332, a nearly complete skull and postcranial fragments, including four cervical vertebrae housed at Bristol City Museum and Art Gallery, Bristol. The specimen was collected at the Westbury Clay pit, Wiltshire, England, from subdivision E5 of the Aulacostephanus eudoxus ammonite zone, one metre below the Crussoliceras Limestone of the Kimmeridge Clay Formation, dating to the late Kimmeridgian. Nicknamed "Westbury pliosaur I", it was first described by Taylor & Cruickshank (1993) and referred to P. brachyspondylus based on the absence of a ventral keel on the cervical vertebral centra. BRSMG Cc332 was assigned tentatively to Pliosaurus sp. by Sassoon et al. (2012) and Knutsen (2012) and reassigned to its own species by Roger B. J. Benson, Mark Evans, Adam S. Smith, Judyth Sassoon, Scott Moore-Faye, Hilary F. Ketchum and Richard Forrest in 2013. The specific name honours the town of Westbury near which the holotype was found.

The mandible of BRSMG Cc332 is approximately 50 cm longer than CAMSM J.35991 (proposed neotype for P. brachyspondylus), but is shorter than the two French specimens referred to P. brachyspondylus. Knutsen (2012) distinguished BRSMG Cc332 from P. brachyspondylus as the former has a "type IV" retroarticular process and a much lower degree of fusion between the anterior mandibular bones. Benson et al. (2013) diagnosed the species based on three autapomorphies. P. westburyensis has widely spaced premaxillary alveoli, with interalveolar walls approximately half the anteroposterior length of a single alveolus. It also has a long, sheet-like process of the maxilla that extends back to the anterolateral part of the maxilla–frontal contact medial to the external naris, and terminates just anterior to midlength of the orbital. Finally, the suture between the premaxilla and parietal bone is located around orbital midlength. P. westburyensis also possesses a unique combination of characters, including: low dentary alveolar count including only 18 postsymphysial alveoli; teeth fully trihedral in cross-section, possessing a flat, anteroposteriorly broad labial surface lacking enamel ridges; relatively slight mediolateral expansion of premaxilla and maxillary caniniform region; six premaxillary alveoli; lack of anisodont premaxillary dentition; lack of diastema between maxillary and premaxillary alveolar rows; and cervical centra lacking ventral ridge.

Other species

Pliosaurus brachyspondylus 
 
Pliosaurus brachyspondylus was first described and named by Owen in 1839, as a species of Plesiosaurus. The specific name is derived from βραχυς, brachus, meaning "short" and σπόνδυλος, spondylos, meaning "vertebra" in Ancient Greek. It was named on the basis of a series of unassociated cervical vertebrae as the holotype. These specimens were collected at Headington Pits near Oxford, Oxfordshire, England, from the Kimmeridge Clay. It was later noted by Pocock (1908), that the material was found in the lower part of the Kimmeridge Clay, as the pits expose the contact between the Kimmeridge Clay Formation and the underlying Corallian beds. Several other cervical centra from the same strata at Weymouth, Dorsetshire, that had been named Plesiosaurus giganteus by Conybeare (1824), were also referred to Plesiosaurus brachyspondylus by Owen (1839). Eichwald (1868) reassigned P. brachyspondylus to Pliosaurus but did not provide diagnosis to distinguish these vertebrae from those of the type species of the genus. P. giganteus was later synonymised by Lydekker (1889a) with P. brachydeirus, the type species.

According to Tarlo (1959a), the holotypes of P. giganteus and P. brachyspondylus have been lost or destroyed since their initial descriptions. Therefore, he selected a single posterior cervical centrum, CAMSM J.29564, as the neotype of P. brachyspondylus, while P. giganteus became a nomen oblitum, forgotten name, as P. brachyspondylus had traditionally been given priority over it. This centrum was the only not dorsal centrum from a series of thirty associated centra listed by Harry Seeley (1869) as belonging to P. brachyspondylus. They were collected at the Roswell (Roslyn) pit near Ely, Cambridgeshire, also in England, from between the Aulacostephanus mutabilis or Aulacostephanus eudoxus ammonite zones, of the lower Kimmeridge Clay Formation. Although the measurements of the neotype agree with these of the lost holotype, they are also similar to these of referred specimens of P. brachydeirus (OUMNH J.9291-9301) and "Pliosaurus" andrewsi ( R.1243, cast of mid-cervical centrum referred to P. evansi). Additionally, Seeley's referral was based on a single character, "articular surface is very slightly concave, with a small round depression at the centre", a feature that is now known to be common in other pliosaurids as well. Thus, Tarlo's choice of the neotype of P. brachyspondylus relies solely on the similarity in size to the original material described by Owen (1839), which is also similar to P. brachydeirus. The neotype centrum, CAMSM J.29564, differs from the holotype of P. brachydeirus in the following two traits; it has ventral surface ornamentation but lacks a ventral keel. Nevertheless, the neotype for P. brachyspondylus is non-diagnostic from other species of Pliosaurus, and thus the name must be considered a nomen dubium.

In the same paper, Tarlo (1959a) described an associated pliosaur skeleton, CAMSM J.35991, and referred it to P. brachyspondylus. CAMSM J.35991 consists of a complete mandible, most of the axial skeleton and parts of the appendicular skeleton. It was found in 1889 in the Aulacostephanus eudoxus ammonite zone of the lower Kimmeridge Clay, at the same locality as CAMSM J.29564 (the neotype for P. brachyspondylus). Knutsen (2012) suggested to replace the neotype for P. brachyspondylus, with CAMSM J.35991 as the new neotype, because both specimens and possibly the lost holotype are from the same locality and horizon, and similar in size. CAMSM J.35991 is much more complete and can be distinguished from all other species of Pliosaurus. Benson et al. (2013) agreed with this suggestion, but considered P. brachyspondylus to be Thalassophonea indet., until a petition to the ICZN is made. Based on CAMSM J.35991, Knutsen (2012) provisionally diagnosed P. brachyspondylus as a Pliosaurus with approximately 60 (58 according to Benson et al. (2013)) teeth in the lower jaw, 9 pairs of symphyseal teeth in dorsal view. It had "type II" retroarticular process and proportionally shorter humeri than P. funkei. As also seen in CAMSM J.29564, it had cervical centra with ventral surface ornamentation, but lacking a ventral keel. According to Benson et al. (2013), the flat morphology of the proximal surface of the radius or tibia suggests that CAMSM J.35991 is a juvenile.

According to Knutsen (2012), Bardet et al. (1993) referred two additional mandibles to P. brachyspondylus based solely on a similar number of dentary and symphyseal teeth; BHN 2R.370, collected at the Moulin-Wibert quarry, from the Rasenia cymodoce ammonite zone of the Calcaires de Moulin-Wibert Formation of Nord-Pas-de-Calais, and MNHN cat.24.1 collected at Le Havre, Normandy, both from the early Kimmeridgian of France. Benson et al. (2013) discussed only BHN 2R.370 originally referred to Pliosaurus grandis, stating that P. carpenteri has a similar count of dentary and symphysial teeth, and thus the specimen cannot be identified to species level. However it was referred to Pliosaurus indet. as it has a broad, dorsolaterally facing surangular fossa, bounded laterally by a fossa and ridge. Another specimen, BRSMG Cc332, was referred to P. brachyspondylus by Taylor and Cruickshank (1993) and to Pliosaurus sp. by Sassoon et al. (2012) and Knutsen (2012), but was reassigned to its own species P. westburyensis by Benson et al. (2013).

Pliosaurus macromerus 

Pliosaurus macromerus was first described and named by John Phillips in 1871, as a species of Pleiosaurus, on the basis of a large femur, OUMNH J.12498, and a series of unassociated vertebrae. The specific name is derived from μακρός, makros, meaning "long" in Ancient Greek and mēros, meaning "thigh" in Latin, from Greek, in reference to the large size of OUMNH J.12498 (a thigh bone). These specimens were collected during the excavation of the Great Western Railway near Swindon, Wiltshire, probably from the Pectinatites hudlestoni and Pavlovia pallasioides ammonite zone, Upper Kimmeridge Clay, of the Swindon Clay and Cemetery Beds. Lydekker (1889a) amended the Pleiosaurus macromerus into Pliosaurus, and reassigned NHMUK PV OR 39362 to this species with other material, based solely on large size. NHMUK PV OR 39362, a complete skull and mandible, was first described by Owen (1869) who referred it to Pliosaurus grandis. It was collected at Kimmeridge Bay, Dorsetshire, from the Aulacostephanus autissidorensis or Pectinatites elegans ammonite zones of the Upper Kimmeridge Clay Formation, dating to the late Kimmeridgian or early Tithonian.

Tarlo (1959b) erected OUMNH J. 10441, one of the partial cervical vertebrae from the collection of unassociated remains listed by Philips (1871), as the lectotype of P. macromerus. It was assigned to P. macromerus based on its large size, similar to those of P. westburyensis and P. funkei. Tarlo (1959b) described the lectotype as "somewhat roughened", while Lydekker (1889a) described it as being "very coarse and rough" in reference to its ventral rugosity, resembling that of P. brachyspondylus. Tarlo (1959b) also erected a new generic name for P. macromerus, Stretosaurus, due to the unusual scapular morphology of a specimen he described and referred to it, CAMSM J.35990. It was found at Stretham, southwest of Ely in Cambridgeshire, probably from the early Kimmeridgian Aulacostephanus mutabilis ammonite zone. It represents an associated fragmentary skull and a relatively complete postcranial skeleton. Tarlo (1959b) referred CAMSM J.35990, and two other very large, anterior cervical vertebral centra, CAMSM J.29562 and CAMSM J.30057, to Stretosaurus macromerus based on similar size and ornamentation of the cervical vertebrae. Knutsen (2012) noted that this ornamentation is shared with P. westburyensis and the proposed neotype of P. brachyspondylus.

Based on similar number of mandibular symphyseal teeth with NHMUK PV OR 39362, Tarlo (1959b) also assigned to S. macromerus a partial mandible, OUMNH J.10454, represented by an anterior rostral tip and associated trihedral teeth. Nicknamed "Cumnor mandible", it was collected at Chawley brick pit, Oxfordshire, alongside Cumnoria prestwichii. This locality most likely belongs to the Aulacostephanus eudoxus or A. autissidorensis ammonite zone, of the upper part of the Lower Kimmeridge Clay. Knutsen (2012) noted that there is no overlap between the cranial portions of CAMSM J.35990 and NHMUK PV OR 39362 or OUMNH J.10454. Halstead (1989) referred a more recently discovered, complete specimen (NHMUK R8928) to P. brachyspondylus based on its long mandibular symphysis. Using this specimen he re-identified the "scapula" of CAMSM J.35990 as an ilium, but in spite of their similar ilial morphology, reassigned S. macromerus to Liopleurodon. According to Noè et al. (2004), the specimens of S. macromerus should be referred to P. macromerus as the name Stretosaurus is invalid, and NHMUK PV OR 39362 and CAMSM J.35990 exhibit the autapomorphic trihedral teeth of Pliosaurus.

 
Knutsen (2012) suggested to replace the lectotype of P. macromerus, with NHMUK PV OR 39362 as a neotype, because the lectotype (as well as the remaining syntypes) is indistinguishable from all species of Pliosaurus, apart from P. brachydeirus due to vertebral ornamentation. NHMUK PV OR 39362 is much more complete and can be distinguished from all other species of Pliosaurus. NHMUK PV OR 39362 has been traditionally assigned to P. macromerus, and even though it has previously been assigned to P. grandis, Lydekker (1889a) showed that there is no evidence that the syntypes of P. grandis even belong to Pliosaurus, and there is no overlapping material between them and NHMUK PV OR 39362. Benson et al. (2013) agreed with the suggestion to assign a neotype of P. macromerus, but considered it to be Thalassophonea indet., until a petition to the ICZN is made. Based on NHMUK PV OR 39362, Knutsen (2012) provisionally diagnosed P. brachyspondylus as a Pliosaurus with at least 50 teeth in the lower jaw (probably 54), at least 7 pairs (probably 9) of symphyseal teeth and 5 pairs of premaxillary teeth. It also has "type III" retroarticular process. Benson et al. (2013) noted that it lacks anisodont premaxillary dentition.

Other specimens previously referred to P. macromerus are currently assigned to other species of Pliosaurus, rendering this species a nomen dubium. Knutsen (2012) referred CAMSM J.35990 to Pliosaurus sp., stating that it is non-diagnostic at the species level. Benson et al. (2013) agreed that it cannot be confidently diagnosed as a distinct species, or referred to an existing species with certainty. Nevertheless, they differentiated CAMSM J.35990 from most specimens of Pliosaurus based on its subtrihedral teeth, which are otherwise present only in Pliosaurus kevani, and possibly also in Gallardosaurus iturraldei from the Oxfordian of Cuba. Furthermore, it shares with P. kevani a very large body size and stratigraphically closer to P. kevani, but cannot be otherwise compared to it. Therefore, it was tentatively referred to as Pliosaurus cf. kevani. According to Knutsen (2012), OUMNH J.10454 is referable to P. macromerus, together with two associated fragments, OUMNH J.50376 and OUMNH J.50377, each constituting one ramus of a lower jaw from a single individual. All three specimens were collected from the same pit, are of similar size, and have "type III" retroarticular process. The referral to P. macromerus was based on this trait, a suggested similar symphyseal tooth count (six) between OUMNH J.10454 and the proposed neotype of P. macromerus, and their occurrence at approximately the same stratigraphic level. However, a reexamination of NHMUK PV OR 39362 (proposed neotype of P. macromerus) by Benson et al. (2013), revealed that it had at least seven symphyseal tooth, but more likely nine. Therefore, they considered P. rossicus to be a valid species of Pliosaurus based on the presence of an autapomorphic short symphysis containing only six alveoli, and tentatively referred OUMNH J.10454 (and thus possibly OUMNH J.50376 and OUMNH J.50377) to P. ? rossicus. Another possible difference between NHMUK PV OR 39362 and OUMNH J.10454, is that the latter had greater mandibular tooth count of approximately 60, although this is possibly an artifact of its reconstruction according to Knutsen (2012).

Pliosaurus irgisensis 
 
P. irgisensis was first described and named by Nestor Ivanovich Novozhilov in 1948, under the name Peloneustes irgisensis. The specific name is derived from the name of the Maly Irgiz River, where the holotype was found. The holotype, PIN 426 housed at Paleontological Institute, Russian Academy of Sciences, consists of partial cranium and postcranium of a medium-sized individual. The cranial remains of PIN 426 are currently suffering from the effects of pyrite decay, and its associated remains have been lost. It was collected at Savel-evsk Mine No. 1, of eastern Saratov Oblast, European part of Russia, from the middle Volgian stage (also known as middle Tithonian). Novozhilov (1964) reassigned the material to a new genus, Strongylokrotaphus, meaning "round" (strongylos) "temple" or "head" (krotaphos) in Ancient Greek. These assignments were criticized by other workers, including Tarlo (1960), Halstead (1971) and Storrs et al. (2000), because of the general and non-specific diagnosis for Strongylokrotaphus, and differences from the type species of Peloneustes. P. irgisensis might be synonymous with P. rossicus based on their similar sizes and stratigraphic co-occurrence, as the only difference between the species is ontogenetic. Knutsen (2012) considered the material to be non-diagnostic and referred P. irgisensis to Pliosauridae indet, as dentition, which is autapomorphic in Pliosaurus, was not described from PIN 426. Benson et al. (2013) also considered this species to be a nomen dubium, referring it to Thalassophonea indet, and stating that PIN 426 requires re-description.

Pliosaurus portentificus 
Pliosaurus portentificus is known from the late Kimmeridgian of England. Considered by Knutsen (2012) and Benson et al. (2013) to be undiagnostic, with its holotype specimen most likely being a juvenile individual of one of the other species of Pliosaurus.

Description 
It is estimated to have lived approximately 147 million years ago. Analysis of bones from the four flippers suggest that the animal cruised using just two fore-flippers, using the back pair for extra speed when pursuing and capturing prey. P. funkei brain was of a similar type and size, proportionally, to that of today's great white shark.

Phylogeny 
The cladogram below follows a 2013 analysis by paleontologists Benson et al.

See also 
 Timeline of plesiosaur research

References

External links 
 
 https://www.reuters.com/article/scienceNews/idUSL2771508220080227?pageNumber=2&virtualBrandChannel=0
 Gigantic Pliosaurus discovered on Norwegian soil
 Pliosaurus - Naturhistorisk museum
 Sea Monsters: A Prehistoric Adventure Movie - Interactive Time Line - National Geographic
 Britannica Online Encyclopedia
 BBC Earth (video): The most powerful marine reptile ever

Pliosaurids
Kimmeridgian life
Tithonian life
Late Jurassic plesiosaurs of Europe
Jurassic England
Fossils of England
Jurassic Norway
Fossils of Svalbard
Agardhfjellet Formation
Jurassic Russia
Fossils of Russia
Fossil taxa described in 1842
Taxa named by Richard Owen
Sauropterygian genera